Trinity (stylized as TRINITY) is a three-member Thai pop boy band formed in 2019. The members were brought together after the Nine by Nine special project ended in 2019. The group is composed of Sivakorn Adulsuttikul, Lapat Ngamchaweng and Jackrin Kungwankiatichai; former member Teeradon Supapunpinyo departed from the group in August 2021. The company and Teeradon released two separate statements announcing his departure from the group. 4nologue said that the group will continue with three members.

Trinity has released one mini-album, five singles, and one featured single since their debut. They also held three showcase stages across the country.

Members
Porsche (ปอร์เช่) – rapper
Third (เติร์ด) – vocalist
Jackie (แจ๊คกี้) – vocalist

Former members
James (เจมส์) – rapper

History

TRINITY

Pre-debut Days 
After 9by9 project ended, 4nologue reunited its three representatives in the group, Porsche, Third and Jackie - to make a new project.

The official name "Trinity" and its official acronym "TNT",- was invented by the members. The hashtag for Trinity  "TRINITY_TNT" was the first on Twitter trending topics on the day it was announced. Their main concept of the group, Three Musketeers, was the identity they needed to constantly improving through singing and dancing practices. After ending his contract with Nadao Bangkok, JamyJamess became an exclusive talent of 4NOLOGUE, and was included on Trinity project. The concept, so as the official logo, was preserved despite this member change. But TRINITY chose to turn their main triangle into a 3D triangles, with four sides, each side representing one of the members.

Training ceaselessly for more than six months, on June 4, 2019, James - Third - Porsche and Jackie were officially introduced to the press as 4NOLOGUE’s first boygroup. Even though the members also work in various art categories, being a Trinity member gives them a way to reload their passion as music performers.

TRINITY 

Including the concept of the four elements to their main one (Three Musketeers), TRINITY had their debut on September 17, 2019, at Central World Square. Releasing their music video for "Haters Got Nothing" on the same day, the video got 1 million views in 18 hours. They also released their mini album, "The Elements" on the same day.

TRINITY also released their fandom name, "Twilight", sharing the fact that even if the days are rough, Twilight sky is always there to bring you comfort and a promise of better days ahead. As for the elements, each member has one, according to their personalities: James is Wind, Third is Earth, Porsche is Fire and Jackie is Water. All four singles for their mini album has a focus on it. Following the hit of "Haters Got Nothing" music video, they soon released their second single, "IOU", together with their music video for it and promoting their songs with small concerts, called "Trinity Showcase".

By the end of 2019, they released a four episode documentary called "Trinity The Elementories" on LineTV. The videos tells the beginning of their journey as Trinity members, Trinity as a group and their debut date.

TRINITY 2020 
After the outbreak on covid-19, all their plans for a comeback, second album and mini concerts had to be postponed.

On June 18, TRINITY became the very first Thai group to have an account on the popular South Korean live streaming app VLIVE. Until the end of the VLIVE for Thai Artists, the boygroup made several lives, so as posting their music videos, "The Elementories" series, special videos for their performances on their "The Elements" showcases and,a small series called "One Day Wih TRINITY"".

TRINITY - "5:59 (Five Fifty Nine)" and Concert 
Due to the pandemic, Trinity couldn't work on new projects that demanded outdoors activities to meet their fans, - and because they missed Twilight and the lives streamings weren't enough, they released a special single called "5:59 (Five Fifty Nine)" in September 2020, as a celebration of their 1st year anniversary as a group.

Following the measures to prevent covid-19, they performed as special guest at the Hallyu Festival "Unite On", held online on November 23rd. The show had performances of famous k-pop artists, such as Monsta X, Super M, Oh My Girl and Itzy.

In November, 4nologue announced their new batch of trainees, who shared a track called "Yesterday Today Tomorrow" with Trinity. The music video for the festive song reached 1M views on Youtube. 4nologue also announced TRINITY's official lightstick, coming up with the announcement of their first full concert, "Invisible World Concert", - which was later postponed due to the increase of the covid-19 cases in Thailand.

Discography

Tours and Concerts

Concert Tours

Awards and nominations

References

Thai boy bands
Musical groups established in 2019
2019 establishments in Thailand
Musical groups from Bangkok
Musical quartets
Musical trios